Vinnikovo is a rural locality (a village) in Podlesnoye Rural Settlement, Vologodsky District, Vologda Oblast, Russia. The population was 28 as of 2002.

Geography 
Vinnikovo is located 21 km southeast of Vologda (the district's administrative centre) by road. Duravino is the nearest rural locality.

References 

Rural localities in Vologodsky District